Zemun Polje railway station is the rail station in Zemun Polje, Zemun, Serbia. Located in the settlement Zemun Polje in the municipality of Zemun. Railroad continued to Batajnica in one, and Zemun in the another direction. Zemun Polje railway station consists of 5 railway track.

See also 
 Serbian Railways
 Beovoz
 BG Voz

References 

Railway stations in Belgrade
Zemun